Hammond is an unincorporated community in Ozark County, Missouri, United States.

A post office called Hammond was established in 1894, and remained in operation until 1975. Some say the community has the name of the local Hammond family, allegedly the original owners of the town site, while others believe it is unknown why the name "Hammond" was selected.

Hammond is the site of the historic Hammond Mill. The mill was built in 1907 and served as a gristmill until around 1940. The mill has since been restored as a private residence.

References

Unincorporated communities in Ozark County, Missouri
Unincorporated communities in Missouri